Flavored syrups typically consist of a simple syrup, that is sugar (fully mixed with water while heated), with naturally occurring or artificial (synthesized) flavorings also dissolved in them. A sugar substitute may also be used. 

Flavored syrups may be used or mixed with carbonated water, coffee, pancakes, waffles, tea, cake, ice cream, and other foods. There are hundreds of flavors ranging from cherry and peach to vanilla to malt, hazelnut, coconut, almond, gingerbread, chocolate, peppermint, rootbeer, and even toasted marshmallow.

In addition to food and drink, flavored syrups are commonly used in pharmaceutical compounding.

In coffee and espresso drinks
Flavored syrups can also be used to make frappes, which when made with coffee can have other names such as frappuccino, a word created by Starbucks Corporation to trademark their version.

See also

 Agave nectar
 Birch syrup
 Bludwine
 Chocolate syrup
 Italian soda
 List of syrups
 Maple syrup
 Soda jerk
 Torani

References

Flavors
Syrup